Elaine Rita Dundy (née Brimberg; August 1, 1921 – May 1, 2008) was an American novelist, biographer, journalist, actress and playwright.

Early life
She was born Elaine Rita Brimberg in New York City. Her Polish Jewish immigrant father, Samuel Brimberg, was an office furniture manufacturer and a violent bully. Her mother was of Latvian Jewish descent; she was the daughter of a multimillionaire manufacturer and inventor. Dundy was one of three sisters; a sibling was Shirley Clarke, the independent filmmaker. Dundy grew up in a Park Avenue home where she was educated by a governess, though she eventually attended high school, where her boyfriend Terry was the son of playwright Maxwell Anderson. Later, they met again and almost married.

A habituée of New York nightclubs from the age of 15, she met the exiled Dutch painter Piet Mondrian, who wished to be taught how to jitterbug. An honors graduate from Sweet Briar College in Sweet Briar, Virginia, she studied acting at the Jarvis Theatre School in Washington with future star actors Rod Steiger, Tony Curtis and others, and in the Dramatic Workshop was taught by Erwin Piscator.

Dundy's controlling father insisted she live at home while in New York, but she calculated that her monthly allowance would allow her to live in Paris for a short time. At the end of World War II, she traveled to Europe, first to live in Paris, France, dubbing French films, then settled in London, where she performed in a BBC radio play. In 1950, she met the theater critic Kenneth Tynan, and two weeks later, they began living together. They married on January 25, 1951, had a daughter Tracy (born May 12, 1952, London), and became part of the theatrical and film elite of London and Hollywood.

Radio and television
Among her roles as an actress, she appeared in "The Scream," a 1953 episode of the TV series Douglas Fairbanks, Jr. Presents, and a BBC-TV production of Dinner at Eight as a maid: "One of those small parts an actress can do absolutely nothing with except look as pretty as possible, act as naive as possible and stay out of the way of the knives." Dundy was heard in different roles on Radio Luxembourg's Harry Lime dramas, directed by Orson Welles. In 1955, Dundy and Tynan appeared together on camera, hosting the "Madrid Bullfight" episode of Around the World With Orson Welles, the documentary series Welles made for Associated-Rediffusion, a contractor for Britain's ITV commercial network.

Books
In 1958, Dundy published her first novel The Dud Avocado, loosely based on her experiences in Paris. It reached the top of the bestseller lists. She received a letter from an admirer:Dear Mrs Tynan, I don't make the habit of writing to married women, especially if the husband is a dramatic critic, but I had to tell someone (and it might as well be you since you're the author) how much I enjoyed The Dud Avocado. It made me laugh, scream and guffaw (which incidentally is a great name for a law firm). If this was actually your life, I don't know how on earth you got through it. Sincerely, Groucho Marx.

Tynan disapproved of Dundy's writing vocation despite having forecast success, because it distracted attention from himself; Dundy, however, had seen it as a means to save their marriage. Around this time, Tynan started to insist on flagellating his wife, with the threat of his own suicide if she refused. Drugs, alcohol, and extramarital affairs by both parties resulted in the marriage becoming fraught, and it was dissolved in 1964. In 1962, she was a writer for the BBC's satirical That Was the Week That Was. Dundy attempted to cure herself of addictions from 1968 to 1976, though according to her daughter, she struggled with drugs and alcohol for half a century. Dundy lived mainly in New York after her divorce. In addition to novels and short stories, Dundy wrote for The New York Times. She wrote books on the actor Peter Finch, the city of Ferriday, Louisiana, and Elvis Presley.

As part of her research for the Presley book, Dundy moved from her luxurious suites in London and New York to live for five months in Presley's birthplace of Tupelo, Mississippi. Elvis and Gladys was first published by Macmillan in 1985 (reissued in 2004 by the University Press of Mississippi). The Boston Globe hailed it as "nothing less than the best Elvis book yet." Kirkus Reviews described it as "the most fine-grained Elvis bio ever."

Later life
Dundy maintained a home in London until 1986, and then moved to Los Angeles to be near her daughter. By then, Tracy was a costume designer; she is married to film director Jim McBride. Dundy's autobiography, Life Itself!, was published in 2001. In the same year, Kenneth Tynan's diaries, written in his last decade, were published. Their daughter had helped to have the book issued. It led to a two year split between the two women, until Dundy re-entered rehabilitation once more. Her 1964 novel, The Old Man and Me, was reissued in 2005 by the feminist publishing company Virago Press, and that same year, she wrote the introduction for Virago's reprint of Daphne du Maurier's 1932 novel I'll Never Be Young Again.

Tracy Tynan's memoir Wear and Tear, published in the United States in 2016, deals with Tynan's trying experiences of her parents.

Death
In Dundy's final years, she was losing her eyesight due to macular degeneration. She died of a heart attack in Los Angeles, California on May 1, 2008, aged 86. She is buried at Westwood Village Memorial Park Cemetery.

Bibliography

Novels
The Dud Avocado (1958)
The Old Man and Me (1964)
The Injured Party (1974)

Biographies
Finch, Bloody Finch: A Biography of Peter Finch (1980)
Elvis and Gladys (1985)
Ferriday, Louisiana (1991)
Life Itself! (2001) (autobiography)

Plays
My Place (1962)
Death in the Country (1976) (in Vogue, 1974.)
The Drowning (1976)

Articles
Hip, Beat & Square, The Observer, 4 December 1960
Memory in Spain, The Observer, 25 December 1960
Stanley Kubrick and Dr. Strangelove, Queen 13 March 1963 (reprinted in Glamour, April 1964)
Reviewing Reviewing (on the first issue of the New York Review of Books), The Spectator, 7 June 1963
Formentoracle, The Observer, 4 May 1964
Crane, Masters, Wolfe, Etc. Slept Here (on the Chelsea Hotel), Esquire October 1964
What Means Tiny Alice? (on Edward Albee), New York Herald Tribune, 31 January 1965
How To Succeed In The Theatre Without Really Being Successful, Esquire May 1965
The Image in the Marketplace, Esquire July 1965
Can a Simple Welsh Lass of Thirty-six Find Happiness with a Macedonian Rock-and-Roll Star of Twenty-four?, Esquire December 1965
[on Christopher Plummer], New York Herald Tribune, 26 December 1965
Tom Wolfe Issue (letter), New York Review of Books 17 March 1966 
Tom Wolfe ... But Exactly, Yes! Vogue, April 1966
[on Rosemary Harris], New York Herald Tribune, 10 April 1966
Vivien Leigh: On Interviewing a Star On a Wet Washington Day, Village Voice 1966
Suddenly It's Fun, The Observer, 20 August 1967
Finding out the hard way what it means to be Jewish, The (London) Times, 11 February 1976
Life is All Ups and No Downs on This Carousel (on Erik Erikson), New York Times, 5 September 1976
Why Actors Do Better for Sidney Lumet, New York, 22 November 1976,
review of Changing, by Liv Ullmann, The Saturday Review, 5 February 1977
review of Haywire, by Brooke Hayward, The Saturday Review, 2 April 1977
Born to Please (on Vivien Leigh), New York Times, 22 May 1977
introduction to I'll Never Be Young Again, Daphne du Maurier, 2005

Short story
"The Sound of a Marriage", Queen, 1960 or 1965? (reprinted, Cosmopolitan, February 1967)

References

External links

Life Itself (lengthy excerpt)
Elaine Dundy website

Interview with Elaine Dundy
Elvis News interview with Elaine Dundy 
"Out of the Darkness": Elaine Dundy on losing her sight 

1921 births
2008 deaths
20th-century American actresses
20th-century American novelists
American expatriates in England
American women journalists
American people of Latvian descent
American people of Polish-Jewish descent
American television actresses
American voice actresses
Jewish American writers
People from the Upper East Side
Sweet Briar College alumni
Writers from Manhattan
20th-century American dramatists and playwrights
20th-century American biographers
American women biographers
American women novelists
20th-century American women writers
20th-century American short story writers
Journalists from New York City
Novelists from New York (state)
Historians from New York (state)
Celebrity biographers
American expatriates in France
20th-century American Jews
21st-century American Jews
21st-century American women